Mangelia verrucosa is a species of sea snail, a marine gastropod mollusk in the family Mangeliidae.

This is a taxon inquirendum. G.B. Sowerby III described this species as Clathurella verrucosa, previously erroneously referred as Mangelia clathrata M. de Serres. K.H. Barnard mentioned in 1958 Mangilia verrucosa Sowerby III with 11–14 axial ribs (compared to Mangilia minuscula E.A. Smith, 1910)

Description
The length of the shell attains 3.1 mm.

Distribution
This marine species occurs off Port Elizabeth, South Africa.

References

External links
  Tucker, J.K. 2004 Catalog of recent and fossil turrids (Mollusca: Gastropoda). Zootaxa 682:1–1295.
 

Endemic fauna of South Africa
verrucosa
Gastropods described in 1897